Diakhandara may refer to:

Diakhandara River
Diakhandara Glacier